Jean Ambrose (born 27 September 1993) is a footballer who plays as a defender. Born in France, he represents Haiti at international level.

Club career
Ambrose joined Girondins de Bordeaux in 2014 from AS Moulins. He made his Ligue 1 debut on 13 December 2015 against Angers SCO replacing Nicolas Maurice-Belay after 79 minutes.

He joined Sedan of the Championnat National in the summer of 2016 but was shortly released following disciplinary reasons.

On 6 December 2016, Ambrose joined Bulgarian club Lokomotiv Gorna Oryahovitsa until the end of the 2016–17 season. Ambrose left without permission before the end of the season and the club applied for legal proceedings at FIFA.

International career
In March 2017, Ambrose was called up to the 30-man squad by the Haiti national football team's interim coach, Jean-Claude Josaphat.

Ambrose made his debut for the senior Haiti national football team in a 3–3 2017 Kirin Challenge Cup tie with Japan on 10 October 2017.

References

1993 births
Living people
Sportspeople from Sens
Haitian footballers
Haiti international footballers
French footballers
French sportspeople of Haitian descent
Citizens of Haiti through descent
Association football defenders
French expatriate footballers
French expatriate sportspeople in Bulgaria
Expatriate footballers in Bulgaria
Ligue 1 players
First Professional Football League (Bulgaria) players
FC Girondins de Bordeaux players
CS Sedan Ardennes players
FC Lokomotiv Gorna Oryahovitsa players
Footballers from Bourgogne-Franche-Comté
Haitian expatriate sportspeople in Bulgaria
French expatriate sportspeople in Bhutan
Haitian expatriate sportspeople in Bhutan
Expatriate footballers in Bhutan